The Fortaleza River originates in the Department of Ancash, Peru, in the foothills of the Cordillera Negra. It presents a highly irregular regime, so much so that in the months of June to October it does not reach the Pacific Ocean. Its waters are intensely used for the cultivation of sugarcane. It crosses the province of Barranca from east to west and reaches the Pacific Ocean through the agroindustrial valley of Paramonga. Its mouth is located just north of the town of Paramonga.

See also
 List of rivers of Peru
 List of rivers of the Americas by coastline

References

Rivers of Peru
Ancash Region